Boo to You Too! Winnie the Pooh is a Halloween television special produced by Walt Disney Television Animation with the animation production done at Toon City Animation, Inc. in Manila, Philippines, along with the additional production at Thai Wang Film Productions in Bangkok, Thailand. Based on the Disney television series The New Adventures of Winnie the Pooh, originally broadcast on October 25, 1996 on ABC.

Phil Spencer won the 1997 Primetime Emmy Award for Outstanding Individual Achievement in Animation for his work on this film.

Synopsis

On Halloween, Pooh and his friends are eager to go trick-or-treating. Piglet has never gone trick-or-treating, having always been too afraid of the frightening atmosphere of Halloween. After building an imposing mannequin in an attempt to face his fears, he joins his friends in preparation for trick-or-treating. Pooh's attempt to get honey from a bee hive ends in failure, and the bees chase the group into Rabbit's garden, destroying some of his pumpkins. As night falls and a thunderstorm looms, Tigger overzealously speaks of the horrors of Halloween, frightening Piglet enough that he runs home and barricades the door.

Sympathetic to Piglet's fear, Pooh, Eeyore and Tigger decide to avoid the frightening aspects of Halloween and throw Piglet a less frightening "Hallo-wasn't" party instead. When the three costumed friends show up at Piglet's house, he mistakes them for a monster and flees. The trio of friends discover Piglet is missing, and go to search for him in the night. Simultaneously, Piglet goes looking for Pooh and the others, but when he can't find any of his friends, Piglet believes they've all been taken by "Spookables".

Still wearing their costumes, Pooh, Eeyore and Tigger make their way through the increasingly stormy night to find Piglet, but their fears get the best of them. Pooh's costume gets stuck in a tree branch, and the other two struggle to pull him out. Hearing Pooh's cries for help, Piglet happens upon the scene and believes two "Spookables" are attacking his friend. Determined to help his friend, Piglet summons his courage and uses his mannequin to seemingly rescue Pooh. When the mannequin collapses in the midst of the ensuing chaos, the others believe Piglet has vanquished the apparent monster. They commend Piglet for his bravery, and they all go trick-or-treating together.

Cast

 John Fiedler as Piglet
 Steve Schatzberg as Piglet (Singing voice)
 Jim Cummings as Winnie the Pooh and Tigger
 Peter Cullen as Eeyore
 Ken Sansom as Rabbit
 Michael Gough as Gopher
 John Rhys-Davies as the Narrator

Movie connections
Boo to You Too! was also featured as a Halloween story in Pooh's Heffalump Halloween Movie, where the story is told by Roo while also happening at the same time. However Pooh and Tigger’s lines about mentioning Heffalumps were dubbed into Spookables due to the fact Lumpy is a Heffalump and Rabbit’s greenish fur was recolored into yellow so it wouldn’t look to similar from The New Adventures of Winnie the Pooh.

References

External links 
 

1996 television specials
American films with live action and animation
Halloween television specials
Winnie-the-Pooh specials
Disney television specials
1990s American television specials
Winnie the Pooh (franchise)
Television specials by Disney Television Animation
Films scored by Mark Watters